Joshua Davis may refer to:

Joshua Davis (designer) (born 1971), American web designer and founder of Praystation.com
Josh Davis (swimmer) (born 1972), American Olympic gold medalist swimmer
DJ Shadow (born 1972), disc jockey whose real name is Joshua Davis
Joshua Davis (writer) (born 1974), American author and journalist
Josh Davis (American football) (born 1980), American football wide receiver for the Carolina Panthers
Josh Davis (basketball, born 1980), American professional basketball player
Josh Davis (basketball, born 1991), American professional basketball player

See also 
Joshua Davis House (disambiguation)